Michael Barrett may refer to:

Politicians
 Michael J. Barrett (born 1948), American politician in Massachusetts
 Michael Barrett (Irish politician) (1927–2006), Irish Fianna Fáil politician
 Michael Barrett (Canadian politician) (born 1984), Canadian Member of Parliament in Ontario

Sportsmen
 Mike Barrett (footballer) (1959–1984), English footballer
 Mike Barrett (sportscaster) (born 1968), American sportscaster
 Mike Barrett (basketball) (1943–2011), American basketball player
 Michael Barrett (baseball) (born 1976), American baseball player

Others
 Michael Barrett (cinematographer) (born 1970), American cinematographer
 Michael Barrett (Fenian) (1841–1868), hanged for his alleged role in the Clerkenwell bombing
 Michael Barrett (physician) (1816–1887), British-Canadian physician and teacher
 Michael Barrett (author) (1924–1999), Australian fiction author of The Invincible Six
 Michael B. Barrett (born  1946), American Army Brigadier General and former assistant professor of history at The Citadel
 Michael R. Barrett (born 1951), American judge
 Michael David Barrett (born 1962), stalker of TV personality Erin Andrews
 Michael Barrett (theologian) (born 1949), American academic dean and professor of Old Testament
 Michael Barrett (scientist) (born 1964), Professor of Biochemical Parasitology

See also 
 Micheal Barrett (born 1964), 17th Sergeant Major of the U.S. Marine Corps
 Michael Barret, a character in the Nickelodeon sitcom Zoey 101 played by Christopher Massey
 Michael Barratt (disambiguation)